Good God Almighty may refer to:

 "Good God Almighty" (Crowder song), a 2021 song by Crowder
 "Good God Almighty", a 1964 jazz standard from The Blues (Alex Harvey album)
 "Good God Almighty", a 2003 song by Nappy Roots from Wooden Leather

See also
 God Almighty (disambiguation)